The 2015 Rushmoor Borough Council election took place on 7 May 2015 to elect members of the Rushmoor Borough Council in England. It was held on the same day as other local elections.

Two seats were up for election in the West Heath ward due to the resignation of an incumbent.

Results

Ward results

Aldershot Park

Cherrywood

Cove and Southwood

Empress

Fernhill

Knellwood

Manor Park

North Town

Rowhill

St John's

St Mark's

Wellington

West Heath

References

2015 English local elections
May 2015 events in the United Kingdom
2015
2010s in Hampshire